The Kinzua Dam, on the Allegheny River in Warren County, Pennsylvania, is one of the largest dams in the United States east of the Mississippi River. It is located within the Allegheny National Forest.

A boat marina and beach are located within the dam boundaries. In addition to providing flood control and power generation, the dam created Pennsylvania's second deepest lake, the Allegheny Reservoir, also known as Kinzua Lake, and Lake Perfidy among the Seneca. Quaker Lake, a smaller artificial lake that empties into the reservoir, was also formed as a result of the dam.

The lake extends 25 miles to the north, nearly to Salamanca, New York, which is within the Allegany Reservation of the Seneca Nation of New York. Federal condemnation of tribal lands to be flooded for the project displaced more than 600 Seneca members and cost the reservation , nearly one-third of its territory and much of its fertile farmland.

Construction
In 1936, a major flood struck the Pittsburgh metropolitan area and caused widespread damage. This prompted Congress to pass the Flood Control Acts of 1936 and 1938, authorizing the construction of a dam on the Allegheny River. Construction of the dam was not begun by the US Army Corps of Engineers until 1960. It was completed in 1965, and the filling of the reservoir continued until 1967.

By then, considerable opposition to the dam had developed, particularly among the Seneca Nation of Indians based in New York. The proposed flooding of lands behind the dam to create a lake for recreation and hydropower would make them lose most of the historic Cornplanter Tract in Pennsylvania as well as numerous communities and thousands of acres of fertile farmland in New York. More than 600 families were displaced by the project and forced to relocate.

The main purpose of the dam was flood control on the Allegheny River. According to the Corps of Engineers, side benefits derived from the dam would include drought control, hydroelectric power production, and recreation. The hydroelectric power is distributed largely to Pittsburgh.

Engineering data
Length of dam: 
Maximum height of dam: 
Earthfill: 3 million cubic yards (2.3 million m³)
Concrete: 500,000 cubic yards (380,000 m³)
Penstocks (pipes through dam): Eight 5’ 8" x 10’ discharge sluices and two hydroelectric penstocks,  in diameter
Hydroelectric generating capacity: 400 megawatts
Construction Costs: $108 million

"Finished in 1965 at a cost of almost $120 million, it is the largest concrete and earth-fill dam in the eastern United States."

Economics
The total cost of construction was approximately $108 million. According to the US Army Corps of Engineers, Kinzua more than paid for itself in 1972 when tropical storm Agnes dumped continual heavy rains on the watershed, bringing the reservoir to within three feet of its maximum storage capacity. Downstream flood damages were avoided of an estimated $247 million. The dam at Kinzua has prevented an estimated $1 billion in flood damages since it became operational.

Seneca Pumped Storage Generating Station

Immediately above the downstream side of the dam is the Seneca Pumped Storage Generating Station, a hydroelectric power plant using pumped storage to accommodate peak electrical load by storing potential energy in water pumped into an upper reservoir. It uses base load electricity, then reclaims that energy when needed by allowing the water to fall back down and drive generators along the way.

Recreation
The Allegheny Reservoir, also known as Kinzua Lake, and surrounding area have been opened up for a variety of recreational activities such as camping, hiking, snowmobiling and boating along the reservoir. The US Forest Service created four highly developed reservoir campgrounds, along with five primitive (boat to or hike only) camping areas. Several scenic overlooks with miles of hiking trails and information centers were also constructed along the reservoir. Much of Allegheny National Recreation Area surrounds Allegheny Lake.  In addition, the Seneca Nation maintains a fully developed campground on their reservation at the northern end of the reservoir in New York.

Displacements

Condemnation of Seneca land

Construction of the dam condemned  of the Allegany Reservation, nearly one third of its territory, which had been granted to the Seneca nation in the Treaty of Canandaigua, signed by President Washington. That resulted in the loss of considerable fertile farmland and the displacement and forced relocation of 600 Seneca from their community within the reservation. In 1961, citing the immediate need for flood control, President John F. Kennedy denied a request by the Seneca to halt construction.

Following the relocation were major changes to the displaced persons' way of life. Until the mid-20th century, numerous Seneca tribe members, particularly those in the floodplain, had lived simply according to traditional ways, with no modern conveniences such as electricity. Two residential resettlement areas were constructed, Jimersontown and an area south of Steamburg, both of which included modern amenities. The forced modernization is one source of the still-simmering resentment that Seneca have toward the dam.

In addition, the Seneca lost a 1964 appeal over the related relocation of a four-lane highway through the remaining portion of the Allegany Reservation. That caused them to lose more land to the interstate, which divides the reservation territory. (The reservation was allowed to reclaim land around the old highway that the interstate replaced.) 
 
In Pennsylvania, the government also condemned most of the historic Cornplanter Tract, a grant made by the state legislature to Cornplanter after the Revolutionary War to him and his heirs "forever." The area included an historic cemetery containing the remains of Cornplanter and 300 descendants and followers, as well as a state memorial monument erected in 1866. The Seneca called the cemetery their "Arlington" in reference to the national cemetery near Washington, DC.

The state exhumed and reinterred the Seneca remains in a new cemetery, located west of the north-central Pennsylvania town of Bradford, about 100 yards from the New York state line. The cemetery also contains remains of white residents of Corydon, a town submerged by the reservoir. However, by 2009 Seneca observers and whites said there was erosion of the bluff where the cemetery was located. They pleaded for the state or Corps of Engineers to protect this area. Other remains were reinterred at a cemetery in Steamburg.

Cornplanter's last direct heir and great-great-great-grandson, Jesse Cornplanter, an artist, had died without issue in 1957. By the 1960s, Cornplanter's indirect descendants had already moved to Salamanca, New York, near the northern shore of the new Allegheny Reservoir.

Condemnation of Corydon, Kinzua, Quaker Bridge, and Red House
The construction of the dam and the filling of the Allegheny Reservoir required the condemnation of several towns and communities in the reservoir's floodplain. Two townships, Kinzua in Pennsylvania and Elko (Quaker Bridge) in New York, dissolved their incorporations, while the Warren County portion of Corydon was likewise subsumed. Others, such as the McKean County portion of Corydon, Pennsylvania and Onoville, New York, retained their government but lost much of their population when the cores of their communities were flooded. All residents were forced out by the government's use of eminent domain and were required to relocate.

Red House, New York, was also indirectly affected by the changes. Although it was not directly flooded, the dam's first stress test in 1967 submerged New York State Route 17 west of Red House, and a new highway, the Southern Tier Expressway, would have to be constructed. The path of the highway was run almost directly through Red House's population center, which combined with the dam and the expansion of Allegany State Park prompted the state and the Army Corps of Engineers to forcibly condemn most of the town. Some of the town's residents bought parcels in what was then the hamlet of Baystate, located in the town a mile south of the highway, and were able to thwart efforts to forcibly dissolve the town when Allegany State Park proposed to expand again in 1973. Red House (population 38 as of 2010) has maintained its incorporation, with a few remaining families still holding onto their properties. In preparation for the eviction, the Onoville, Quaker Bridge, and Red House post offices were closed in summer 1964, and as a result, the ZIP codes for those towns were never officially used.

To partially compensate for the loss of the communities, the government set aside 305 acres of land for Seneca resettlement upstream in two New York communities: Steamburg (160 one-acre plots of land located south of the existing hamlet of the same name) and Jimerson Town (145 one-acre plots of land located west of the city of Salamanca, near the then-extant community of Shongo). Jimerson Town has become designated as one of the two capitals of the Seneca Nation.

The dam project also forced the displacement of Camp Olmsted, owned by the Chief Cornplanter Council of the Boy Scouts of America. The campsite had been located on bottomland along the Allegheny River, but the dam's construction forced it to be moved up the hillside.

In other media
The song "As Long as the Grass Shall Grow", written by Peter La Farge and recorded by Johnny Cash as the first track of his 1964 album Bitter Tears: Ballads of the American Indian, relates the loss of Seneca Nation land in Pennsylvania due to the construction of the Kinzua Dam. Cash received resistance by radio stations to this material and the album was lost. The documentary Johnny Cash's Bitter Tears recounted these events and a re-imagining of the album was recorded to accompany it. This was aired on PBS in February 2016.

The fourth verse of Buffy Sainte-Marie's 1965 song "Now That The Buffalo's Gone" asks if the US Government is "...still taking our lands..." and refers to the treaty signed by George Washington that guaranteed the Seneca their lands.  It asserts "...the treaty's being broken by Kinzua Dam," and asks "...what will you do for these ones?".

In 2014, filmmakers Paul Lamont and Scott Sackett began production of a documentary for PBS titled Lake of Betrayal, concerning the construction of Kinzua Dam and creation of Allegheny Reservoir. The film is slated for broadcast in November 2017.

The Kinzua Dam appears in the TV show See directed by Steven Knight and produced for Apple TV+ by Chernin Entertainment / Endeavor Content, it appears destroyed and leaking as the location for "the Queen" in that series.

References

Further reading
 Hauptman, Laurence Marc (2014) In the Shadow of Kinzua: The Seneca Nation of Indians since World War II. Syracuse, NY: Syracuse University Press.
 Weist, Katherine (2001) "For the Public Good: Native Americans, Hydroelectric Dams, and the Iron Triangle," in R. L. Clow and I. Sutton (eds.), Trusteeship in Change: Toward Tribal Autonomy in Resource Management. Boulder, CO: University Press of Colorado. pp. 55–72.
 Bilharz, Joy A. (1998) The Allegany Senecas and Kinzua Dam: Forced Relocation through Two Generations. Lincoln, NE: University of Nebraska Press.

External links

Dams in Pennsylvania
Hydroelectric power plants in Pennsylvania
Crossings of the Allegheny River
Dams completed in 1965
Energy infrastructure completed in 1965
Buildings and structures in Warren County, Pennsylvania
Native American history of New York (state)
Native American history of Pennsylvania
United States Army Corps of Engineers, Pittsburgh District
United States Army Corps of Engineers dams
Allegheny National Forest
1965 establishments in Pennsylvania